Pope Evaristus was the bishop of Rome from  99 to his death  107. He was also known as Aristus and is venerated as a saint in the Eastern Orthodox Church, the Catholic Church, and Oriental Orthodoxy. It is likely that John the Apostle died during his reign period, marking the end of the Apostolic Age.

Biography

According to the Liber Pontificalis, he was a Greek by birth, fathered by a Jew named Judah from the city of Bethlehem. He was elected during the reign of the Roman emperor Trajan, and succeeded Clement I in the See of Rome. He has divided the titles among the priests in the city of Rome, and ordained seven deacons to keep the bishop preaching, on account of the style of truth.

According to the book  Evaristus decreed that “in accordance with Apostolic tradition marriage should be celebrated publicly and with the blessing of the priest”.

Eusebius, in his Church History IV, I, stated that Evaristus died in the 12th year of the reign of Emperor Trajan after holding the office of bishop of the Romans for eight years.

Liber Pontificalis further describes him as the one "crowned with martyrdom". The same is indicated also by the book "The lives and times of the popes". However, in the Roman Martyrology he is listed without the martyr title, with a feast day on 26 October.

Pope Evaristus is buried near the body of Saint Peter in the Vatican, in the Saint Peter's tomb under the Saint Peter's Basilica.

See also

List of Catholic saints
List of popes

References

External links 

 Writings attributed to Pope St Evaristus
 Patron Saints Index: Pope Saint Evaristus
 Catholic Online – Saints & Angels: St. Evaristus
 

1st-century births
107 deaths
1st-century Romans
2nd-century Christian saints
2nd-century Romans
Papal saints
People from Bethlehem
Greek popes
Popes
1st-century Jews
2nd-century Jews
Year of birth unknown
1st-century popes
2nd-century popes
Burials at St. Peter's Basilica